The 2015–16 Spartak Moscow season was the 24th successive season that the club played in the Russian Premier League, the highest tier of association football in Russia. Spartak Moscow took part in the Russian Cup and also took part in 2016–17 UEFA Europa League season.

Season events
Following the termination of Murat Yakin's contract as manager on 30 May 2015, with Dmitri Alenichev being appointed as manager on 10 June 2015.

Squad

Out on loan

Left club during season

Transfers

In

Out

Loans out

Released

Competitions

Russian Premier League

League table

Results by round

Results

Russian Cup

Squad statistics

Appearances and goals

|-
|colspan="14"|Players away from the club on loan:

|-
|colspan="14"|Players who appeared for Spartak Moscow but left during the season:

|}

Goal scorers

Clean sheets

Disciplinary record

References

FC Spartak Moscow seasons
Spartak Moscow